Transport in Bulgaria is dominated by road transport, despite nearly half of all paved roads belonging to the lowest category of roads. As of December 2015, the country had 829 kilometers of highways.

Buses play a significant role in long-distance public transport, coaches are operated by private companies. Sofia has three major national bus terminals, the Central, the Western and the Southern Terminals. In the countryside share taxis are in operation between smaller settlements.

Railway systems are mostly outdated, and the average speed is comparatively low; however, upgrading projects are underway. BDŽ is the national railway company, but private freight operators are also present. The Sofia Metro has three lines as of 2020.

Air traffic has been growing since the 2000s, which was facilitated by the opening of a second terminal at Sofia Airport, as well as the implementation of new destinations and routes. The flag carrier is Bulgaria Air, but a number of private charter companies also exist, operating domestic and international flights.

Ports along the Danube and the Black Sea are the most important concerning Bulgaria's water transport system. The two largest ports are in Varna and in Burgas.

Air transport 

After the second terminal of International Airport Sofia was built the total number of passengers for the country rose and reached 6,595,790 in 2008, and in April 2011 Airport Sofia serviced 282 694 passengers, 13% more than the same period of 2009, when the record was 250 000 passengers. In 2011 passenger traffic at Bulgaria's three major airports - Sofia, Varna and Bourgas - grew up to near 10% on the year to 3.89 million in the first half of 2011, due to rise of customers using international routes and launch of new destinations. In 2014, Bulgarian airports served 7,728,612 passengers and handled 23,101 tons of goods.

In the past aviation compared with road and railroad transport used to be a minor mode of freight movement, and only 860,000 passengers used Bulgarian airlines in 2001. In 2013 Bulgaria had 68 airports, 57 of which had paved runways. Two airports, Sofia Airport and Burgas Airport, had a runway longer than 3,000 meters, and there were four heliports. The second- and third-largest airports, Varna Airport and Burgas Airport, serve mainly charter flights and have regular domestic links with the capital. In the early 2000s, Sofia Airport received substantial renovation, with aid from a Kuwaiti-led consortium, in anticipation of increased air connections with Europe. A three-phase expansion was scheduled for completion in 2010. The communist-era state airline, Balkan Airlines, was replaced by Bulgaria Air, which was privatised in 2006. In 2004 Bulgaria Air transported 365,465 passengers to international destinations, including all major European cities, while in 2014 this number was at 897,422.

Railways 

In 2005 Bulgaria had some 6,238 kilometers of open access track owned by the state company "National Company Railway Infrastructure", including a 125 kilometers long 760 mm narrow gauge railway - the Septemvri-Dobrinishte narrow gauge line and 4,316 km were considered main lines. Sofia, Plovdiv and Gorna Oriahovitsa are the hubs of the domestic system and of international rail connections. 

Bulgaria's rail system has not expanded since the 1980s, in 2014 there were 4,023 kilometers of main lines. There are upgrading projects underway. After the completion of the Plovdiv - Dimitrovgrad high-speed line on 1 July 2012 the top operating speed was raised to 200 km/h and the national top speed record of 197 km/h set between Iskar and Elin Pelin with a leased Siemens Taurus electric locomotive is soon expected to be broken. There are also plans for upgrading for high speed operation and doubling (where needed) of the Plovdiv - Burgas railway. By the end of 2013, a total of 461 km of high-speed lines were expected to be built.

In the mid-2000s, railways remained a major mode of freight transportation, but with increasing problems with the maintenance of the infrastructure and lowering speeds, highways carried a progressively larger share of freight. The national passenger and freight operator is called Bulgarian State Railways, but there are also a number of private operators including Bulgarian Railway Company and DB Schenker Rail Bulgaria.

In 2014 the Bulgarian railways carried 14,225,000 tons of freight and 21.3 million passengers in 2019.

Sofia Metro 

In 1998 the first six kilometres of an often-interrupted 52 km standard gauge subway project (the Sofia Metro) opened in Sofia. Additional stations were later built, and in 2012 a second line opened. By April 2015 the total length was 36 km with 31 stations and Line 2 serving Sofia Airport. In 2016 the expansion of the network continued, as construction works on the third line commenced, and the system reached a total length of 40 km, with 35 stations along its two lines. In 2021, the metro was expanded to 52 km total length with 47 stations on 4 lines. Further expansions are expected in the period 2021-2027.

Road transport 

In the early 2000s, Bulgaria had some 37,300 kilometers of roads, but nearly half of which (18,000 kilometers) fell into the lowest international rating for paved roads. 324 kilometers of high-speed highways were in service in 2000. Another  of highways are under various stages of construction. Roads have overtaken the railroads as the chief mode of freight transportation.

Long-term plans call for upgrading higher-quality roads and integrating the road system into the European grid. The focus is on improving road connectors with the neighbouring countries and domestic connections linking Sofia, Plovdiv, Burgas and Varna. Bulgaria has delayed building some key highway connections since the 1990s, but European Union membership is a strong incentive for completion. A 114-kilometer link between eastern Bulgaria and the Turkish border is scheduled for completion in 2013. As of 2004, two international highways passed through Bulgaria, and a major highway ran from Sofia to the Black Sea coast. Proposed international corridors would pass from north to south, from Vidin to the border with Greece and from Ruse to the border with Greece, and west to east, from Serbia through Sofia to Burgas, Varna, and Edirne (Turkey). The Vidin-Calafat bridge was completed in 2013, relieving road and railroad traffic to Romania.

Motorways and expressways 

 Trakia motorway - Sofia - Plovdiv - Stara Zagora - Yambol - Karnobat - Burgas  (completed)
 Hemus motorway - Sofia - Yablanitsa - Shumen - Varna (Yablanitsa to Shumen remaining)
 Struma motorway - Sofia - Pernik - Blagoevgrad - Kulata (Greece) (under construction)
 Maritsa motorway - Chirpan to Kapitan Andreevo (Turkey) (completed)
 Cherno More motorway - Varna to Burgas (planned)
 Europe motorway - Sofia - Kalotina (Serbia) (under construction)
 Veliko Tarnovo–Ruse motorway Veliko Tarnovo - Rousse (Romania) (planned)

Major roads 
 I-1 road
 I-2 road
 I-3 road
 I-4 road
 I-5 road
 I-6 road
 I-7 road
 I-8 road
 I-9 road
 Sofia ring road

Long-distance public transport

Buses are frequently used in Bulgaria for long-distance travel. Long-distance coaches depart from Sofia from the Central, West and South Bus Stations, international routes are served by the Serdika Station. Besides public buses, coaches are also operated by private companies, like Union-Ivkoni, Biomet or Etap-Grup. Tickets can be purchased at the offices of these companies, at stations and from the bus driver. Some companies offer online booking. International destinations include Saloniki, Istanbul, Bucharest, Skopje and Belgrad. Share taxis called marshrutka operate in Sofia, and in the countryside between smaller settlements.

Waterways 
470 km (2006) along the 2,300 km long Pan-European corridor VII along the Danube River. Other smaller rivers, as Kamchiya and Ropotamo, are navigable only for recreational uses.

Pipelines 
In 2005, Bulgaria had 2,425 kilometers of natural gas pipelines, 339 kilometers of oil pipelines, and 156 kilometers of pipelines for refined products. The pipeline system was scheduled for substantial changes and additions, however. The 279-kilometer Burgas-Alexandroupolis Pipeline, still under negotiation among Bulgaria, Greece, and Russia in 2006, would provide a bypass of the overloaded Bosporus Strait. The line would enable Russian oil arriving at the Bulgarian oil port of Burgas to reach Greece's Mediterranean port at Alexandroupolis. A 900-kilometer U.S.- financed alternate route, known as the AMBO pipeline, would bring oil from Burgas across Bulgaria and North Macedonia to the Albanian port of Vlore on the Adriatic Sea, bypassing both the Bosporus and Greece. As of October 2006, approval of both pipelines was expected. With international investment, Bulgaria began constructing a new domestic gas transportation network beginning in 2005. The Russian Gazprom company planned a gas pipeline from Dimitrovgrad in eastern Bulgaria across Serbia, reaching the Adriatic Sea in Croatia. Some 400 kilometers of the planned Nabucco Pipeline, bringing gas from Azerbaijan and Iran to Central Europe, were to cross Bulgaria sometime before 2011.

Ports and harbours

River ports 

Lom, Nikopol, Oryahovo, Ruse, Silistra, Svishtov, Tutrakan, Vidin are river ports on the Danube river.

Sea ports 

Sea ports

Ahtopol, Balchik, Burgas, Nesebar, Pomorie, Sozopol, Tsarevo, Varna

Container terminals

The major and largest ports with international significance are Varna and Burgas.

Yacht ports

Balchik, Burgas, Byala, Golden Sands, Nesebar, Sozopol, Sveti Vlas, Varna

Merchant marine 
total: 31 ships

ships by type:
bulk carrier: 31 ships grouped by volume of 24,000 - 13,000 DWT, 35,000 - 25,000 DWT and 43,000 - 36,000 DWT

Urban transport 

While most urban and suburban transport in Bulgaria is composed of buses (using an increasing number of CNG vehicles), around a dozen cities also have trolley bus networks. The capital Sofia also has a tram and an underground network.

See also 
Bulgaria
List of bridges in Bulgaria
Executive Agency for Exploration and Maintenance of the Danube River
Sofia Public Transport
Pan-European corridors
International E-road network
Trans-European Transport Network
List of the busiest airports in Europe
List of metro systems
List of tram and light rail transit systems
List of highest paved roads in Europe by country
List of highest paved roads in Europe

References 

 ''This article incorporates public domain material from

External links

 Bulgarian road quality map — Google Maps
 Prime Minister Borisov vows to build seven new highways
 Truck transport Bulgaria
 Executive Agency Marinetime Administration
 Executive agency for Exploration and Maintenance of the Danube river